Ihya Libya is a political party in Libya which was founded on 24 August 2017 by Aref Ali Nayed. Its stated aim is to create a "stable, democratic and prosperous country". After being launched, the movement became dormant, before being re-launched on 20 August 2018, when Aref Nayed announced his candidacy for the Next Libyan general election. 

The movement is centered around "four pillars", which are key reforms and developments it believes are necessary to create a stable Libya by 2023. These include:   

 peace, security and the rule of law
 economic development
 human development
 governance and public sector reform

References 

Political parties established in 2017
Political parties in Libya
Civic nationalism
Libyan nationalism